A huckabuck, also known as a hucklebuck, a “cold cup”, or a “dixie cup” (referring to the paper or plastic cup commonly used to make it) is a homemade frozen dessert enjoyed by people in southern states particularly in Louisiana and in Georgia. It consists of a paper cup that is filled with some sort of sweet liquid like Kool-Aid, and frozen. Children buy them on their way home from school from the candy lady for a dime, or sometimes a quarter; other things are generally sold with them: chips and candy. The trick to eating it is to flip the huckabuck over so the soft sugary part is at the top. Then grab a spoon and dig in. They are still served to this day at the New Orleans Jazz Festival, in many neighborhoods around central and southern Louisiana.

References

Louisiana cuisine
Frozen desserts
Cuisine of New Orleans